Schwartze Mansion is a historic home located at Baltimore, Maryland, United States in the Irvington Community. It is a two-story, five bay brick Greek Revival building constructed in 1845.  It features a flat roofline embellished with a deep modillioned cornice above a frieze decorated with recessed panels.  Augustus Jacob Schwartze (1839-1860), a prominent founding investor in Baltimore's important early 19th century textile industry sold land to his brother-in-law, C. Irving Ditty. Augustus and Irving had met while captains of the Maryland Regiment F in the Civil War).

Augustus's father, Henry Schwartze (1795-1850) owned most of the land in Irvington. Henry was also father of Sophia L. Schwartze who became Ditty's wife. In 1874, Irving purchased a large amount of this land, between Frederick Avenue and Old Frederick Road, from his mother-in-law, Sophia F. Schwartze. Irving had three dirt streets laid out, running north and south between the two turnpikes. He commissioned contractor A.S. Potter to build four houses on the avenue farthest west. Ditty named this street Augusta, after his eldest daughter. The other two streets today are Collins and Loudon. Ditty, his wife and five children lived at the Schwartze Mansion, also known as the Irving Mansion. After Ditty’s death in 1887, Sophia could no longer afford the expense of two homes (they also owned a three-story townhome in Baltimore), and the mansion was sold, in 1904, to the Marciano family. The mansion was in the Marciano family until 1972.

Irvington first appeared on a map in 1877.

Schwartze Mansion was listed on the National Register of Historic Places in 1985.

References

External links
, including photo from 2004, at Maryland Historical Trust

Houses on the National Register of Historic Places in Baltimore
Houses in Baltimore
Houses completed in 1845
Greek Revival houses in Maryland
Irvington, Baltimore
1845 establishments in Maryland